King of the Mountain may refer to:

Games 
 King of the Hill (game), a childhood game involving attempting to solely occupy the highest point on a raised platform or hill
 King of the Mountain (board game), a 1980 board game

Film and television 
 King of the Mountain, alternative title for Beyond the Summit, a 2018 Russian film starring Vladimir Vdovichenkov
 King of the Mountain (film), a 1981 film starring Harry Hamlin
 The King of the Mountain (film), a 2007 Spanish thriller

Music 
 "King of the Mountain" (Kate Bush song), 2005
 "King of the Mountain" (George Strait song), 1996
 "King of the Mountain" (Midnight Oil song), 1990
 "King of the Mountain", a song by Bon Jovi from 7800° Fahrenheit
 "King of the Mountain", a song by Kiss from Asylum
 King of the Mountains, an album by Rodney Carrington

Sport 

 King of the Mountain (race), an annual mountain race in Pomona, Queensland, Australia
 King of the Mountain match, a professional wrestling match
 King of the Mountains, a title given to the best climber in a cycling road race
 Peter Brock or "King of the Mountain" (1945–2006), Australian motor racing driver
 Jeff Jarrett or "The King of the Mountain" (born 1967), American professional wrestler

See also 
 King asleep in mountain, a motif in folklore and mythology
 King Under the Mountain, a title for the ruler of Erebor in J.R.R. Tolkien's legendarium
 King of the Hill (disambiguation)